B Line, B-Line or Line B may refer to the following:

Transportation

US
B (New York City Subway service), a subway route in New York
B-Line (Norfolk Southern), a freight-rail line in Virginia
Green Line B branch, a light-rail line in Boston, Massachusetts
B-Line Rivalry, a sports rivalry between Boston College and Boston University
 B Line (Los Angeles Metro), a rapid transit line in Los Angeles County, California
B (Los Angeles Railway), former streetcar service in Los Angeles, US
RapidRide B Line, a bus route in King County, Washington
B Line (RTD), a light-rail system in Denver, Colorado
Butte Regional Transit, a bus system in Butte County, California
B Line (Minnesota), a planned rapid bus line in Minneapolis-Saint Paul
Riverview Corridor, previously known as the B Line

Elsewhere
Line B (Buenos Aires Underground), an underground line in Buenos Aires, Argentina
B-Line (Hamilton), a proposed light-rail line in Hamilton, Ontario
Line B (Prague Metro), a subway route in Prague, Czech Republic
B-Line (Sydney), a bus-rapid-transit system in Sydney, Australia
B-Line (Vancouver), a bus-rapid-transit system in Vancouver, British Columbia
Mexico City Metro Line B, a rapid-transit line in Mexico City
:fr:Ligne B du métro de Rennes, a future subway route in Rennes, France

Other uses 
"B Line" (song), a track on Lamb's album Fear of Fours
The Eighties Matchbox B-Line Disaster, an English rock band
Index register, in computing, per outdated British use
A finding in lung ultrasound

See also
 Bee line (disambiguation) 
 B Train (disambiguation)

ru:B (маршрут метро)